Brenda Lowe Pogge (born March 18, 1957) is an American politician of the Republican Party. From 2008 to 2020 she had been a member of the Virginia House of Delegates, representing the 96th district on the Virginia Peninsula, made up of parts of James City and York Counties.

Notes

References

Brenda Pogge; Experienced Conservative Leadership for Virginia's 96th District (Constituent/campaign website)

External links

1957 births
Living people
Republican Party members of the Virginia House of Delegates
Women state legislators in Virginia
Politicians from Norfolk, Virginia
21st-century American politicians
21st-century American women politicians